Olegario González de Cardedal (born October 2, 1934) is a Spanish Catholic theologian and author. He was born in Lastra del Cano (Ávila), Spain, in 1934. He studied in Ávila, where he was ordained a priest in 1959, and at the University of Munich, Germany, where he graduated in theology in 1964. He also continued his studies in Oxford and Washington. As Chair of Theology at the Pontifical University of Salamanca, Spain, a position he still holds, he took part in the third session of the Second Vatican Council and in the International Theological Conference. He is also an ordinary member of the Spanish Real Academia de Ciencias Morales y Políticas (Royal Academy of Moral and Political Sciences) in Madrid.

His many publications include: «Meditación teológica desde España», 1970; «Elogio de la encina. Existencia cristiana y fidelidad creadora», 1973; «La gloria del hombre», 1973; «Jesús de Nazaret. Aproximación a la cristología», 1975; «La gloria del hombre. Reto entre una cultura de la fe y una cultura de la increencia», 1985; «Raíz de la esperanza», 1995; «Cuatro poetas desde la otra ladera. Unamuno, Jean Paul, Machado, Oscar Wilde», 1996; «La entraña del cristianismo», 1997; «Cristología», 2001; «Sobre la muerte», 2002, «Dios», 2004. Olegario de Cardedal's primary academic interest appears to be Christology ( in which inter alia he has shown interest for Anglican contributions). He has also written many essays on the current situation of the Church in Spain.

Olegario de Cardedal has organised a succession of theology summer schools in Santander.

Awards
 Ratzinger Prize (issued by the Ratzinger Foundation), 30 June 2011, the ceremony took place in the Clementine Hall. Fellow recipients were Manlio Simonetti and Maximilian Heim

References

20th-century Spanish Roman Catholic theologians
1934 births
Academic staff of the Pontifical University of Salamanca
Living people
21st-century Spanish Roman Catholic theologians
Ratzinger Prize laureates